Over the Hills and Far Away may refer to:

Music
 "Over the Hills and Far Away" (traditional song), an 18th-century song
 Over the Hills & Far Away: The Music of Sharpe, a soundtrack album
 "Air Bharr na G-Cnoc 's an Ime G-Céin — Over the Hills and Far Away" by Seán "Clárach" Mac Domhnaill (written c. 1715), see Mo Ghile Mear
 "Over the Hills and Far Away" (Led Zeppelin song)
 "Over the Hills and Far Away" (Gary Moore song)
 Over the Hills and Far Away (EP), an EP by Nightwish
 "Over the Hills and Far Away", a 1976 single by Kevin Johnson
 "Over the Hills and Far Away", an orchestral piece by Frederick Delius
  "Children's March: Over the Hills and Far Away", a children's march by Percy Grainger
 "Over the Hills and Far Away", a 1908 popular song by William Jerome (w.) and Jean Schwartz (m.)
 "Over the Hills and Far Away", a song by The Mission from the 1987 album The First Chapter

Other uses
 Over the Hills and Far Away (short story collection), by Edward Plunkett, 18th Baron Dunsany
 Over the Hills and Far Away, a 2002 novel by Candida Lycett Green
 "Over the Hills and Far Away", an episode of One Tree Hill
 "Over the Hills and Far Away", an episode of That '70s Show